John Enraght (1701-1766) was an eighteenth century Irish Anglican priest: the Archdeacon of Ardfert from 1765 until 1766.

Enraght was born in County Kerry and educated at Trinity College, Dublin. He died on 18 October 1766; and is buried in Corston, Somerset.

References

18th-century Irish Anglican priests
Archdeacons of Ardfert
Diocese of Limerick, Ardfert and Aghadoe
People from County Kerry
1701 births
1766 deaths